The 2015 NBA Development League Draft was the 15th draft of the National Basketball Association Development League (NBDL). The draft was held on October 31, 2015, just before the 2015–16 season.

Key

Draft

First round

Second round

Third round

Fourth round

Fifth round

Sixth round

Seventh round

References
 D-League Draft Board

Draft
NBA G League draft
National Basketball Association lists
NBA Development League draft